The courts of the United States are closely linked hierarchical systems of courts at the federal and state levels. The federal courts form the judicial branch of the US government and operate under the authority of the United States Constitution and federal law. The state and territorial courts of the individual U.S. states and territories operate under the authority of the state and territorial constitutions and state and territorial law.

Federal statutes that refer to the "courts of the United States" are referring only to the courts of the federal government, and not the courts of the individual states and counties. Because of the federalist underpinnings of the division between sovereign federal and state governments, the various state court systems are free to operate in ways that vary widely from those of the federal government, and from one another. In practice, however, every state has adopted a division of its judiciary into at least two levels, and almost every state has three levels, with trial courts hearing cases which may be reviewed by appellate courts, and finally by a state supreme court. A few states have two separate supreme courts, with one having authority over civil matters and the other reviewing criminal cases. 47 states and the federal government allow at least one appeal of right from a final judgment on the merits, meaning that the court receiving the appeal must decide the appeal after it is briefed and argued properly. Three states do not provide a right to a first appeal. Rather, they give litigants only a right to petition for the right to have an appeal heard.

State courts often have diverse names and structures, as illustrated below. State courts hear about 98% of litigation; most states have courts of special jurisdiction, which typically handle minor disputes such as traffic citations, and courts of general jurisdiction responsible for more serious disputes.

The U.S. federal court system hears cases involving litigants from two or more states, violations of federal laws, treaties, and the Constitution, admiralty, bankruptcy, and related issues. In practice, about 80% of the cases are civil and 20% criminal. The civil cases often involve civil rights, patents, and Social Security while the criminal cases involve tax fraud, robbery, counterfeiting, and drug crimes. The trial courts are U.S. district courts, followed by United States courts of appeals and then the Supreme Court of the United States. The judicial system, whether state or federal, begins with a court of first instance, whose work may be reviewed by an appellate court, and then ends at the court of last resort, which may review the work of the lower courts.

Institutions which may be considered courts of the United States are listed below.

United States Federal Courts

Geographic based jurisdiction
 Trial Courts: United States district courts (see federal court sections by state below for specific district courts)
 List of United States district and territorial courts (94 courts, also listed by state below)
 Appellate Courts: United States courts of appeals
 United States Court of Appeals for the First Circuit
 United States Court of Appeals for the Second Circuit
 United States Court of Appeals for the Third Circuit
 United States Court of Appeals for the Fourth Circuit
 United States Court of Appeals for the Fifth Circuit
 United States Court of Appeals for the Sixth Circuit
 United States Court of Appeals for the Seventh Circuit
 United States Court of Appeals for the Eighth Circuit
 United States Court of Appeals for the Ninth Circuit
 United States Court of Appeals for the Tenth Circuit
 United States Court of Appeals for the Eleventh Circuit
 United States Court of Appeals for the District of Columbia Circuit
 Court of last resort:
 Supreme Court of the United States

Specific subject-matter jurisdiction

 United States federal courts with Original Jurisdiction over specific subject matter:
 United States Tax Court
 Patent Trial and Appeal Board
 International Trade Commission
 United States Court of International Trade
 United States Court of Federal Claims
 United States Foreign Intelligence Surveillance Court
 United States bankruptcy courts
 Trademark Trial and Appeal Board
 United States Merit Systems Protection Board
 United States Alien Terrorist Removal Court
 Courts with Appellate Jurisdiction over specific subject matter:
 United States Court of Appeals for the Federal Circuit
 United States Court of Appeals for the Armed Forces
 United States Army Court of Criminal Appeals
 Navy-Marine Corps Court of Criminal Appeals
 Air Force Court of Criminal Appeals
 Coast Guard Court of Criminal Appeals
 United States Court of Appeals for Veterans Claims
 United States Foreign Intelligence Surveillance Court of Review
 United States Court of Military Commission Review
 Civilian Board of Contract Appeals
 Armed Services Board of Contract Appeals
 Postal Service Board of Contract Appeals
 Office of Dispute Resolution for Acquisition
 Board of Immigration Appeals
 Board of Veterans' Appeals

Former United States Courts
 Board of Patent Appeals and Interferences (before 2012)
 Court of Appeals in Cases of Capture (1780–1789)
 Temporary Emergency Court of Appeals (1971–1992)
 United States circuit courts (1789–1911)
 United States Commerce Court (1910–1913)
 United States Court of Customs and Patent Appeals (1909–1982)
 United States Court of Private Land Claims (1891–1904)
 United States Court for Berlin (1955–1990)
 United States District Court for the Canal Zone (  -1982)
 United States Court for China (1906–1943)

Courts by state of the United States
 State supreme courts
 State court (United States)

Alabama

Alaska

Arizona

Arkansas

California

Colorado

Connecticut

Delaware

Florida

Georgia

Hawaii

Idaho

Illinois

Indiana

Iowa

Kansas

Kentucky

Louisiana

Maine

Maryland

Massachusetts

Michigan

Minnesota

Mississippi

Missouri

Montana

Nebraska

Nevada

New Hampshire

New Jersey

New Mexico

New York

North Carolina

North Dakota

Ohio

Oklahoma

Oregon

Pennsylvania

Rhode Island

South Carolina

South Dakota

Tennessee

Texas

Utah

Vermont

Virginia

Washington

West Virginia

Wisconsin

Wyoming

Courts in the District of Columbia
 District of Columbia Court of Appeals
 Superior Court of the District of Columbia

Federal courts located in the District of Columbia
 Supreme Court of the United States
 United States Court of Appeals for the District of Columbia Circuit
 United States District Court for the District of Columbia
 United States Tax Court
 United States Court of Appeals for the Federal Circuit
 United States Court of Appeals for Veterans Claims
 United States Court of Federal Claims
 United States Court of Appeals for the Armed Forces
 United States Foreign Intelligence Surveillance Court of Review
 United States Foreign Intelligence Surveillance Court

Former federal courts in the District of Columbia
 United States District Court for the District of Potomac (1801–1802; also contained pieces of Maryland and Virginia; extinct, reorganized)

Courts of the Territories of the United States

American Samoa

 High Court of American Samoa

Guam
 Supreme Court of Guam
 Superior Court of Guam

United States territorial court
 District Court of Guam

Northern Mariana Islands
 Northern Mariana Islands Supreme Court
 Northern Mariana Islands Superior Court

United States territorial court
 United States District Court for the Northern Mariana Islands

Panama Canal Zone
 United States District Court for the Canal Zone (abolished 1982)

Puerto Rico
 Supreme Court of Puerto Rico (Tribunal Supremo de Puerto Rico)
 Circuit Court of Appeals of Puerto Rico (Tribunal de Apelaciones)
 * Courts of First Instance of Puerto Rico (Tribunal de Primera Instancia; 13 divisions)

Federal courts located in Puerto Rico:
 United States District Court for the District of Puerto Rico

United States Virgin Islands
 United States Virgin Islands Supreme Court
 United States Virgin Islands Superior Court (2 divisions)

United States territorial court
 District Court of the Virgin Islands

Extraterritorial courts of the United States
 United States Court for China (1906 to 1943), appointed judge held court in cities in China including Shanghai, Hankow, Tientsin, and Canton.
 United States Court for Berlin (1979), existed on paper since 1955, but constituted in fact only once, to hear a single case.

U.S. judicial system in popular culture

Due to its involvement in the resolution of crimes and conflicts, which are an intricate part of drama, the U.S. judicial system is often portrayed in American literature and films.

Several Hollywood films such as A Few Good Men (1992) and Runaway Jury (2003) are set around its courts.

References

External links
 National Center for State Courts – directory of state court websites.

 
State court systems of the United States
List of Z
United States law-related lists